William F. Wolfe (August 30, 1868 - January 10, 1917) was United States Attorney of the Western District of Wisconsin from 1916 to 1917. Previously, he had been a member of the Platform and Resolutions Committee of the 1912 Democratic National Convention and would go on to be a member of the Committee on Rules and Order of Business of the 1916 Democratic National Convention. Also in 1916, Wolfe was a candidate for the United States Senate. He lost to incumbent Robert M. La Follette, Sr.

References

Wisconsin lawyers
Wisconsin Democrats
1868 births
1917 deaths
19th-century American lawyers